Events from the year 1858 in Ireland.

Events
17 March – In Dublin, James Stephens founds the revolutionary organisation which becomes known as the Irish Republican Brotherhood.
Edward Harland, at this time general manager, buys the small shipyard on Queen's Island, Belfast, from his employer Robert Hickson in conjunction with Gustav Wilhelm Wolff.
Ballinacourty lighthouse at Dungarvan harbour built.

Arts and literature
 First free public library in Ireland opens in Dundalk.

Sport

Births
11 January – Mildred Anne Butler, painter (died 1941).
13 February – James Murray Irwin, British Army doctor (died 1938).
6 March – Coslett Herbert Waddell, priest and botanist (died 1919).
11 March – Tom Clarke, republican (born in England; executed 1916).
2 May – Edith Anna Somerville, novelist (died 1949).
19 May – Mike Cleary, boxer (died 1893).
5 October – Thomas Cusack, Democrat U.S. Representative from Illinois (died 1926).
Full date unknown
Anne Marjorie Robinson, artist (died 1924).

Deaths
4 March – John Ryan, soldier, recipient of the Victoria Cross for gallantry in 1857 at Lucknow, India, killed in action (born 1823).
26 April – Francis Murphy, first Roman Catholic bishop of Adelaide, South Australia (born 1795).
22 July – Mary Aikenhead, founder of the Sisters of Charity (born 1787).
28 July – Alexander Wright, soldier, recipient of the Victoria Cross for gallantry in 1855 at Sebastopol, in the Crimea (born 1826).
17 August – Robert Cane, doctor, member of the Repeal Association and the Irish Confederation, Mayor of Kilkenny (born 1807).
Full date unknown
John Hogan, sculptor (born 1800).
Benjamin Lett, bomber and arsonist in America and Canada (born 1813).
James Roche Verling, British Army surgeon, became personal surgeon to Napoleon Bonaparte on St Helena (born 1787).

References

 
1850s in Ireland
Ireland
Years of the 19th century in Ireland
 Ireland